Gasquet (Tolowa: Mvs-ye) is an unincorporated community in Del Norte County, California, United States,  southwest of the Oregon border  and  northeast of Crescent City. The name is in honor of Horace Gasquet. Horace Gasquet was the owner of the gold mines, hotel, railway, bank and post office; he was also the founder of Crescent City and Happy Camp. A post office operated at Gasquet from 1879 to 1902 and from 1949 to present. Gasquet is located in the Smith River National Recreation Area.

For statistical purposes, the United States Census Bureau has defined Gasquet as a census-designated place (CDP). The census definition of the area may not precisely correspond to local understanding of the area with the same name. Its population is 657 as of the 2020 census, down from 661 from the 2010 census. The ZIP code is 95543. Its area code is 707.

Demographics

The 2010 United States Census reported that Gasquet had a population of 661. The racial makeup of Gasquet was 585 (88.5%) White, 2 (0.3%) African American, 27 (4.1%) Native American, 1 (0.2%) Asian, 1 (0.2%) Pacific Islander, 15 (2.3%) from other races, and 30 (4.5%) from two or more races. Hispanic or Latino of any race were 39 persons (5.9%).

The Census reported that 661 people (100% of the population) lived in households, 0 (0%) lived in non-institutionalized group quarters, and 0 (0%) were institutionalized.

There were 319 households, out of which 57 (17.9%) had children under the age of 18 living in them, 154 (48.3%) were opposite-sex married couples living together, 22 (6.9%) had a female householder with no husband present, 14 (4.4%) had a male householder with no wife present.  There were 22 (6.9%) unmarried opposite-sex partnerships, and 8 (2.5%) same-sex married couples or partnerships. 102 households (32.0%) were made up of individuals, and 38 (11.9%) had someone living alone who was 65 years of age or older. The average household size was 2.07.  There were 190 families (59.6% of all households); the average family size was 2.58.

The population was spread out, with 96 people (14.5%) under the age of 18, 30 people (4.5%) aged 18 to 24, 97 people (14.7%) aged 25 to 44, 298 people (45.1%) aged 45 to 64, and 140 people (21.2%) who were 65 years of age or older.  The median age was 54.0 years. For every 100 females, there were 103.4 males.  For every 100 females age 18 and over, there were 102.5 males.

The homeowner vacancy rate was 1.2%; the rental vacancy rate was 17.7%.  481 people (72.8% of the population) lived in owner-occupied housing units and 180 people (27.2%) lived in rental housing units.

Politics 

Notable people
Retired Canadian Football League quarterback Buck Pierce was born in Gasquet, and attended school in nearby Crescent City.  Pierce played nine seasons in the CFL.  As of 2018, he is the quarterback coach for the Winnipeg Blue Bombers.

Pioneer Mary Adams Peacock carried the U.S. Mail from Crescent City to Grants Pass in the 1880s and 1890s. After operating the hotels at Gasquet Village for nine years under Gasquet family management, she operated the hotels alone for 12 years until she married Pete Peacock who ran the coach station. In 1932, when the Mary Adams Peacock Bridge across the Smith River on Highway 199 near Gasquet was named, it was the first bridge in the state to be named for a woman.  The bridge was built in 1926 and remodeled in 1985.  Two plants, Anemone adamsiana   (considered a variety of Anemone oregana) and Valeriana adamsiana, were named for her.

Climate data
Gasquet has a mediterranean climate (Csb) with mild, dry summers and cool, wet winters.

See also

References

External links

Census-designated places in Del Norte County, California
Census-designated places in California